Harpalus meghalayensis is a species of ground beetle in the subfamily Harpalinae. It was described by Kataev in 2001.

References

meghalayensis
Beetles described in 2001